The Argentina national badminton team represents Argentina in international badminton team competitions and is administered by Argentine Badminton Federation. Argentina competed in the Sudirman Cup three times in 1995, 1997 and 1999.

The Argentinian mixed team also participated in the Pan American Badminton Championships. Mateo Delmastro is the first Argentinian badminton player to play at the Youth Olympic Games.

History 
Badminton has been played in Argentina since the 20th century in clubs and schools across the nation. The sport was promoted in the 1970s by the Argentine Youth Christian Association but did not garner much attention. The national team was formed after the formation of the Argentine Badminton Federation (FEBARA).

Mixed team 
Argentina hosted the first two South American Badminton Championships in 1984 and 1985 and the team qualified for the mixed team event as host nation. The team finished as runners-up in both editions after losing to Peru and Brazil in the final. In 1995, Argentina made their debut in the Sudirman Cup. The team were placed in Group 11. The team lost 1–4 to Slovakia, Malta and Brazil but won their tie 5–0 against Morocco to finish 48th in the overall standings. The team then competed for the next two editions of the Sudirman Cup and lost all of their group ties.

The Argentine mixed team then competed in the 2010 South American Games. The team lost the third place tie to Suriname. In 2013, the team made their debut at the Pan Am Mixed Team Championships and finished in 9th place. In 2020, the team finished as runners-up for a third time at the South American Badminton Championships.

Competitive record

Sudirman Cup

Pan Am Team Championships

Mixed team

South American Team Championships

Mixed team

South American Games

Mixed team

Junior competitive record

Pan Am Junior Team Championships

Mixed team

Players

Current squad

Men's team

Women's team

References 

Badminton
National badminton teams
Badminton in Argentina